An acoustic camera is an imaging device used to locate sound sources and to characterize them. It consists of a group of microphones, also called a microphone array, from which signals are simultaneously collected and processed to form a representation of the location of the sound sources.

Terminology 
The term acoustic camera has first appeared at the end of the 19th century: A physiologist, J.R. Ewald, was investigating the function of the inner ear and introduced an analogy with the Chladni plates (a domain nowadays called Cymatics), a device enabling to visually see the modes of vibration of a plate. He called this device an acoustic camera. The term has then been widely used during the 20th century to designate various types of acoustic devices, such as underwater localization systems or active systems used in medicine. It designates nowadays any transducer array used to localize sound sources (the medium is usually the air), especially when coupled with an optical camera.

Technology

General principles 
An acoustic camera generally consists of a microphone array and optionally an optical camera. The microphones – analog or digital – are acquired simultaneously or with known relative time delays to be able to use the phase difference between the signals. As the sound propagates in the medium (air, water...) at a finite known speed, a sound source is perceived by the microphones at different time instants and at different sound intensities that depend on both the sound source location and the microphone location.
One popular method to obtain an acoustic image from the measurement of the microphone is to use beamforming: By delaying each microphone signal relatively and adding them, the signal coming from a specific direction  is amplified while signals coming from other directions are canceled. The power of this resulting signal is then calculated and reported on a power map at a pixel corresponding to the direction . The process is iterated at each direction where the power needs to be computed.

While this method has many advantages – robustness, easy to understand, highly parallelizable because each direction can be computed independently, versatile (there exist many types of beamformers to include various types of hypothesis), relatively fast – it also has some drawbacks: the produced acoustic map has artifacts (also called side lobes or ghost sources) and it does not model correctly correlated sound sources. Various methods have been introduced to reduce the artifacts such as DAMAS or to take in account correlated sources such as CLEAN-SC, both at the price of a higher computational cost.

When the sound sources are near the acoustic camera, the relative intensity perceived by the different microphones as well as the waves not being any more seen as planar but spherical by the acoustic camera add new information compared to the case of sources being far from the camera. It enables to use more effective methods such as acoustic holography.

Reprojection 
Results of far-field beamforming can be reprojected onto planar or non-planar surfaces.

Two-dimensional 
Some acoustic cameras use two-dimensional acoustic mapping, which uses a unidirectional microphone array (e.g. a rectangle of microphones, all facing the same direction). Two-dimensional acoustic mapping works best when the surface to be examined is planar and the acoustic camera can be set up facing the surface perpendicularly. However, the surfaces of real-world objects are not often flat, and it is not always possible to optimally position the acoustic camera.

Additionally, the two-dimensional method of acoustic mapping introduces error into the calculations of the sound intensity at a point. Two-dimensional mapping approximates three-dimensional surfaces into a plane, allowing the distance between each microphone and the focus point to be calculated relatively easily. However, this approximation ignores the distance differences caused by surfaces having different depths at different points. In most applications of the acoustic camera, this error is small enough to be ignored; however, in confined spaces, the error becomes significant.

Three-dimensional 
Three-dimensional acoustic cameras fix the errors of two-dimensional cameras by taking into account surface depths, and therefore correctly measuring the distances between the microphone and each spatial point. These cameras produce a more accurate picture, but require a 3-D model of the object or space being analyzed. Additionally, if the acoustic camera picks up sound from a point in space that is not part of the model, the sound may be mapped to a random space in the model, or the sound may not show up at all. 3-D acoustic cameras can also be used to analyze confined spaces, such as room interiors; however, in order to do this, a microphone array that is omnidirectional (e.g. a sphere of microphones, each facing a different direction) is required. This is in addition to the first requirement of having a 3-D model.

Applications 
There are many applications of the acoustic camera, with most focusing on noise reduction. The camera is frequently applied to improve the noise emission of vehicles (such as cars, airplanes),trains, structures—such as wind turbines and heavy machinery operations such as mining  or drilling.

Acoustic cameras are not only used to measure the exterior emission of products but also to improve the comfort inside cabins of cars, train or airplanes. Spherical acoustic cameras are preferred in this type of application because the three-dimensional placement of the microphone allows to localize sound sources in all directions.

Troubleshooting of faults that occur in machines and mechanical parts can be accomplished with an acoustic camera. To find where the problem lies, the sound mapping of a properly functional machine can be compared to one of a dysfunctional machine.

A similar setup of the acoustic camera can be used to study the noise inside passenger carts during train operation. Alternatively, the camera can be set up outside, in an area near the train tracks, to observe the train as it goes by. This can give another perspective of the noise that might be heard inside the train. Additionally, an outside setup can be used to examine the squealing of train wheels caused by a curve in the tracks.

Challenges

Dynamic range

Low frequencies in the far-field

Computational power 
The signal processing required by the acoustic camera is very intensive and needs powerful hardware and plenty of memory storage. Because of this, signal processing is frequently done after the recording of data, which can hinder or prevent the use of the camera in analyzing sounds that only occur occasionally or at varying locations. Cameras that do perform signal processing in real time tend to be large and expensive. Hardware and signal processing improvements can help to overcome these difficulties. Signal processing optimizations often focus on reduction of computational complexity, storage requirements, and memory bandwidth (rate of data consumption).

References

Further reading 
 Abrie J., Oberholster. "Localizing the source of the sound efficiently", University of Pretoria Article 2021.

External links 
http://blog.prosig.com/2010/03/15/comparison-between-sound-intensity-probes-and-acoustic-cameras/

Manufacturer links 
https://www.cae-systems.de/en/
https://www.sevenbel.com/en
https://www.sorama.eu/
https://www.acoustic-camera.com/
https://www.distran.ch/
https://www.fluke.com/en-us/product/industrial-imaging/sonic-industrial-imager-ii900
https://nlacoustics.com/
https://web2.norsonic.com/product-cat/acoustic-camera/
https://www.plm.automation.siemens.com/global/en/products/simcenter/simcenter-sound-camera.html
http://www.signalinterface.com/index.html
http://smins.co.kr/en/
https://www.microflown.com/products/sound-localization-systems/near-field-acoustic-camera
https://www.bksv.com/
https://acsoft.co.uk/product/acoustic-camera/
https://www.flir.com/products/si124/
https://soundcam.com/

Acoustics
Imaging